The Marysville Globe is a weekly newspaper based in Marysville, Washington, United States. It is owned by Sound Publishing and was established in 1891.

History

The Marysville Globe was founded as The Leader in 1891 and changed its name to The Globe on February 2, 1892.

In August 2007, the Globe and Arlington Times were sold by Sun News to Sound Publishing.

Sound Publishing suspended printing of several newspapers, including the Globe and Times, in March 2020 due to the economic effects of the COVID-19 pandemic. By April, furloughs and layoffs at Sound Publishing left both newspapers without any staff.

Delivery

Since November 28, 2007, the Marysville Globe delivers one paper to every home with a Marysville address or in the city urban growth boundary/city limits.

References

External links
 Official homepage

Newspapers published in Washington (state)
Marysville, Washington
Black Press newspapers
Mass media in Snohomish County, Washington
Publications established in 1891
1891 establishments in Washington (state)